Brooktrails is a census-designated place and unincorporated community in Mendocino County, California, United States. It shares ZIP code 95490 with Willits. The population was 3,632 at the 2020 census.

History
After being extensively logged from the 1880s to the middle of the twentieth century, Brooktrails Township was founded under a special provision in state law. It was marketed as a vacation mountain retreat for San Franciscans in the 1970s. The smaller parcels are mostly surrounded by the township-owned Brooktrails Redwood Park, a  forest green belt composed of tan oak, Douglas fir and redwood. Brooktrails has over 30 hiking trails and two lakes, Lake Emily and Lake Ada Rose, that store and direct water to its water treatment plant. There is also a small market and a deli. The Brooktrails Township Community Services District, governed by a five-member elected board of directors, provides water, sewer, and recreational services to the residents.

In 2012, Mendocino County paid the back assessments on hundreds of abandoned Brooktrails lots; however, they stopped paying water, sewer and fire assessments for those lots.

The entire community of Brooktrails was evacuated in September 2020 due to the threat of the Oak Fire.

Geography
Brooktrails is in central Mendocino County, occupying hills to the west of Little Lake Valley.

Demographics

The 2010 United States Census reported that Brooktrails had a population of 3,235. The racial makeup of Brooktrails was 2,818 (87.1%) White, 22 (0.7%) African American, 87 (2.7%) Native American, 26 (0.8%) Asian, 4 (0.1%) Pacific Islander, 109 (3.4%) from other races, and 169 (5.2%) from two or more races. Hispanic or Latino of any race were 329 persons (10.2%).

The Census reported that 3,235 people (100% of the population) lived in households, 0 (0%) lived in non-institutionalized group quarters, and 0 (0%) were institutionalized.

There were 1,322 households, out of which 428 (32.4%) had children under the age of 18 living in them, 628 (47.5%) were opposite-sex married couples living together, 156 (11.8%) had a female householder with no husband present, 84 (6.4%) had a male householder with no wife present.  There were 124 (9.4%) unmarried opposite-sex partnerships, and 11 (0.8%) same-sex married couples or partnerships. 344 households (26.0%) were made up of individuals, and 93 (7.0%) had someone living alone who was 65 years of age or older. The average household size was 2.45.  There were 868 families (65.7% of all households); the average family size was 2.90.

The population was spread out, with 752 people (23.2%) under the age of 18, 246 people (7.6%) aged 18 to 24, 894 people (27.6%) aged 25 to 44, 954 people (29.5%) aged 45 to 64, and 389 people (12.0%) who were 65 years of age or older.  The median age was 38.4 years. For every 100 females, there were 108.2 males.  For every 100 females age 18 and over, there were 102.5 males.

The homeowner vacancy rate was 3.9%; the rental vacancy rate was 5.9%.  2,353 people (72.7% of the population) lived in owner-occupied housing units and 882 people (27.3%) lived in rental housing units.

Notable residents
Douglas Killmer, bass guitarist
Steven Seagal, actor and martial artist

Politics

References

Census-designated places in Mendocino County, California
Unincorporated communities in California
Census-designated places in California